Nikola Mektić and Mate Pavić defeated Rajeev Ram and Joe Salisbury in the final, 6–4, 6–3, to win the men's doubles tennis title at the 2021 Eastbourne International. It was the top seeds' seventh career ATP Tour doubles title of the season and they saved five match points in their semifinal match against Lloyd Glasspool and Harri Heliövaara en route to the title.

Juan Sebastián Cabal and Robert Farah were the defending champions from when the tournament was last held in 2019, but the pair lost in the semifinals to Ram and Salisbury.

Seeds

Draw

Draw

References

External Links 
Main Draw

Eastbourne International - Doubles
2021 Men's Doubles